Black Mountain is a rural locality in the Shire of Noosa, Queensland, Australia.

Geography 
The locality Black Mountain is located west of Cooroy and south of Pomona.

The locality presumably takes its name from the mountain. The peak of the mountain has a number of communications towers on it; it is accessed by Eungella Drive.

The Bruce Highway (now built to a freeway standard continuous four-lanes to Brisbane) enters the locality from the north-east (Cooroy) and forms part of the locality's northern boundary with Pomona.

The North Coast railway line forms a small part of the north-eastern boundary of the locality. No railway stations serve the locality, the nearest are in Cooroy railway station and Pomona railway station.

The land use is a mixture of rural residential (mostly in the north and east of the locality) and rural (mostly in the south and west of the locality). The main rural land use is grazing on native vegetation with some forestry.

History 

It was at 482 Black Mountain Road. The first teacher was Miss Catherine Alice Bergin. The school closed for a period in 1919 due to the Spanish flu epidemic. It closed permanently on 31 December 1961. The school building is still extant, having been converted to a residence.

In the ,Black Mountain had a population of 1,175 people (582 men and 593 women).

Today Black Mountain is a rural residential area and lies within the Cudgerie Estate with a collection of real-estate houses in Queenslander style.

Economy 
Black Mountain is home to several boutique rural enterprises and artists' studios.

Education 
There are no schools in Black Mountain. The nearest government primary schools are Pomona State School in neighbouring Pomona to the north, Cooroy State School in neighbouring Cooroy to the east, and Federal State School in neighbouring Federal to the west. The nearest government secondary school is Noosa District State High School, which has its Years 7 & 8 campus in Pomona and its Years 9 to 12 campus in Cooroy.

References

Suburbs of Noosa Shire, Queensland
Localities in Queensland